Sakarya Sports Hall is a multi-purpose indoor arena located at Yazlık neighborhood of Serdivan district in Adapazarı, Sakarya Province, Turkey.

The venue is used for competitions and trainings of a wide variety of sports branches including basketball, volleyball, handball, fencing, table tennis, wrestling, judo, karate, kick boxing and taekwondo. The sports hall was built in a land covering , which was granted to the Youth and Sports Directorate of Sakarya Province by the Serdivan municipality on 1 September 2010. The construction, which was projected to cost  30 million (approx. US$18.75 million in May 2011), began with a ground breaking ceremony held on 25 May 2011. Opened officially on 24 June 2013, the facility has a seating capacity of 5,000.

Events hosted
 3rd International Sakarya Karate Open, 2013, 
 2015 Boys' Youth European Volleyball Championship.

References

Sports venues completed in 2013
Basketball venues in Turkey
Volleyball venues in Turkey
Sports venues in Adapazarı
2013 establishments in Turkey
Turkish Basketball League venues